3 Mile Limit (alternatively titled 1480: Radio Pirates) is a 2014 New Zealand drama film directed by Craig Newland, starring Matt Whelan, Dan Musgrove, Belinda Crawley, David Aston, James Crompton and Elliot Wrightson. It is based on the rise of Radio Hauraki.

Cast
 Matt Whelan as Richard
 Dan Musgrove as Nick
 Belinda Crawley as Judy
 David Aston as Willis
 James Crompton as Morrie
 Elliot Wrightson as Alex
 Carl Dixon as Brendon
 Jordan Mooney as Paul
 Daniel Cresswell as Tim
 John McKee as Frank
 David Capstick as Clive
 Jonny Hair as Barry
 Bruce Hopkins as McGrath
 George Mason as Bobbie

Reception
Elias Savada of Film Threat wrote a positive review of the film.

The New Zealand Herald rated the film 3 stars out of 5 and called it a "Tidy but colourless adaptation of a rocking good story".

Graeme Tuckett of Stuff wrote that while the cast, especially Whelan and Crawley, "give it their all", the film is "without credible dialogue, better drawn characters, and a bit more confidence and swagger in the directors' chair".

References

External links
 
 

New Zealand drama films
2014 drama films